William Moody may refer to:

William Moody (pirate) (died 1719), pirate active in the Caribbean and off the coast of Africa
William Alvin Moody (1954–2013), professional wrestling manager also known by his ring name Paul Bearer
William Henry Moody (1853–1917), U.S. Supreme Court Justice, U.S. Attorney General and U.S. Secretary of the Navy
William Lewis Moody Jr. (1865–1954), founded the American National Insurance Company and built it into a $3 billion powerhouse
William Lewis Moody Sr. (1828–1920), colonel in the American Civil War and founder of the Moody financial empire
William Vaughn Moody (1869–1910), American dramatist and poet
William Moody (Maine politician) (1770–1822), American politician from Maine
William J. Moody (1796–1850s), American lawyer, judge, and politician
William R. Moody (1900–1985), bishop of the Episcopal Diocese of Lexington
William Moody (footballer). (born 1895), English footballer, played for Rochdale, Mid Rhondda and Cardiff City
Bill Moody (detective), detective chief superintendent in London
Bill Moody (judge), American judge
Bill Moody (author) (1941–2018), American writer and jazz drummer

See also
William Mody, MP